Adeline Baud Mugnier (born 28 September 1992) is a French alpine skier. She competed for France at the 2014 Winter Olympics in the alpine skiing events.

References

External links 
 
 
 

1992 births
Living people
Olympic alpine skiers of France
Alpine skiers at the 2014 Winter Olympics
Alpine skiers at the 2018 Winter Olympics
French female alpine skiers
People from Évian-les-Bains
Sportspeople from Haute-Savoie